Yarrabee Wesfarmers Reserve is a 9.23 km2 nature reserve in south-west Western Australia.  It is 120 km north-east of Albany and 481 km south-east of Perth.  It lies on the eastern boundary of the Stirling Range National Park, and is managed by Bush Heritage Australia (BHA), by which it was purchased in 2006 with the financial assistance of Wesfarmers.  It is jointly owned by BHA and by Greening Australia (WA), and forms part of BHA's Gondwana Link project.

Flora and fauna
The reserve protects a large area of remnant vegetation, including tall marri and jarrah woodland, low mallee and Banksia woodland.  About 600 ha of the reserve was previously cleared and is being revegetated by Greening Australia.  Animals expected to be present include malleefowl, western pygmy possums and honey possums, as well as many other species of birds and reptiles.

References

External links
 Bush Heritage Australia

Bush Heritage Australia reserves
Nature reserves in Western Australia
2006 establishments in Australia